Schacontia medalba is a moth of the family Crambidae described by William Schaus in 1904. It is found in Brazil and Peru.

The length of the forewings is 6.5–10 mm. The basal area of the forewings is primarily grey brown. The terminal area of the hindwings is lightly shaded.

References

Moths described in 1904
Glaphyriinae